ISO 14224 Petroleum, petrochemical and natural gas industries -- Collection and exchange of reliability and maintenance data for equipment is an international standard relating to the collection of data for the management of the maintenance of equipment, including reliability data. It covers both methodology for the collection of the data, and details of the data to be collected.

This standard has been last published in September, 2016, and the standard is, beginning 2022, at stage 90.60 ("International Standard under review") in accordance with the  ISO international harmonized stage codes.

References
 ISO web page for this standard

14224
Oil industry standards